Angus Lorne Bonnycastle (November 3, 1873 – September 9, 1941) was a politician in Manitoba, Canada. He served in the Legislative Assembly of Manitoba from 1907 to 1911, as a member of the Conservative Party.  A member of the Bonnycastle family, his great-grandfather, Sir Richard Henry Bonnycastle, was a Lieutenant-Colonel in the Royal Engineers, and supervised building in Kingston, Ontario, Saint John, New Brunswick, and other Canadian cities.

Angus Bonnycastle was born in Campbellford, Ontario, and educated there. He moved to Manitoba in 1893, was called to the Bar in 1905, and worked as a barrister. In religion, Bonnycastle was a member of the Church of England.

In 1902, Angus Bonnycastle married Ellen Mary Boulton, the daughter of Charles Arkall Boulton, a member of the Senate of Canada. They had six children. Son, Richard, was a Manitoba fur trader, adventurer, lawyer and a publisher who founded Harlequin Enterprises, the world's largest publisher of romance novels.

Bonnycastle first ran for the Manitoba legislature in the 1903 provincial election, and lost to Liberal candidate W. J. Doig by 124 votes in Russell. He ran again in the 1907 election, and defeated new Liberal candidate T. A. Wright by nine votes. The Conservatives won the election, and Bonnycastle served as a government backbencher. He was re-elected by eight votes in the 1910 election, and resigned from the legislature in 1911.

Despite being forty years old, Angus Bonnycastle volunteered to serve overseas with the Canadian Expeditionary Force during World War I. As a lieutenant-colonel, he led the 200th Battalion. At the end of the war, he was appointed a county court judge in Dauphin, Manitoba, a position held until his death there in 1941.

External links
 Charles Arkall Boulton Family History (source for death date)
 Biography of Angus Lorne Bonnycastle at the Manitoba Historical Society

Angus Bonnycastle
1873 births
1941 deaths
Lawyers in Manitoba
Progressive Conservative Party of Manitoba MLAs
Canadian Expeditionary Force officers
People from Northumberland County, Ontario